Laughner's Cafeteria was an Indianapolis, Indiana-based cafeteria-style restaurant chain.

History
Laughner's Cafeterias roots trace to 1888 with the opening of Laughner & Perry Confectionary.  It was a joint between William Jonathon Wesley Laughner (Jonathon) and William J. Perry.  Laughner later bought out his partner in 1892, and in 1900 opened Laughner's Dairy Lunch, also in Indianapolis.  Jonathon's brothers, George A., Ora and Elmer, all entered the business. Jonathon and his son Claude opened a restaurant together, and Claude's five children later joined the business.  Claude introduced the cafeteria-style restaurant concept in 1920.  His sons, Charles, Lloyd, and Richard, formed Laughner Brothers.  A cousin was involved in the founding of rival MCL Cafeterias.

Concepts
Laughner Brothers attempted to enter the fast food business with two different drive-ins, one of which was called Laughner's Steer-In, but they were not successful.  Besides the Laughner's Cafeterias, they opened the Dutch Oven in 1971, a pie shop and cafe, Jonathon's Restaurant and Pub, a full-service
restaurant, in 1978, The Oven and Classic U.S. Foods.

Decline
Cafeteria-style restaurants began to decline in popularity in the 1980s, and Laughner's was hit by this decline.  They began closing the out-lying restaurants and gradually retreated to Indianapolis.  The last cafeteria closed in 2000.  Over its 112-year history, four-decades of the Laughner family served in the company.

Loon Lake Lodge
Charles "Chip" Laughner, Jr, the last CEO of Laughner's, converted one of the newer Laughner's Cafeterias to a new concept, Loon Lake Lodge, in 1998.  Located in Castleton, Indiana in a high-traffic area, the lodge-themed restaurant served traditional American fare with twists.  Rattlesnake and pheasant were on the menu, as well as elk and venison.  This venture was spun off as a separate family-owned company, Laughner Investments, headed by Chip.

In the summer of 2010 the Laughner family closed the Loon Lake Lodge, wilderness-themed restaurant, ending a 122-year run in the restaurant business for the Laughners in Indiana. The Laughners cited declining sales and health problems as the reason.

See also
List of cafeterias

External links
Loon Lake Lodge
Photos of Loon Lake Lodge

References

Regional restaurant chains in the United States
Defunct restaurants in Indianapolis
Cafeteria-style restaurants
Food and drink companies established in 1888
Defunct restaurant chains in the United States
Restaurants established in 1920
1888 establishments in Indiana
Restaurants disestablished in 2000
2000 disestablishments in Indiana